Doxander vittatus, common name the vitate snail,  is a species of medium-sized sea snail, a marine gastropod mollusk in the family Strombidae, the true snails.

Subspecies
There are five subspecies : 
Doxander vittatus vittatus (Linnaeus, 1758)
Doxander vittatus apicatus (Man in 't Veld & Visser, 1993)
Doxander vittatus entropi (Man in 't Veld & Visser, 1993)
Doxander vittatus japonicus (Reeve, 1851)
Doxander vittatus campbelli (Campbelli, Griffith & Pidgeon, 1834)

Distribution
This species occurs in the Indo-Pacific off Fiji and also in the South China Sea.

Description
The adult shell size varies between 35 mm and 100 mm.

Phylogeny

In 2006, Latiolais and colleagues proposed a cladogram (a tree of descent) that attempts to show the phylogenetic relationships of 34 species within the family Strombidae. The authors analysed 31 species in the genus Strombus including Doxander vittatus (referred to as Strombus vittatus in their analysis), and three species in the allied genus Lambis. The cladogram was based on DNA sequences of both nuclear histone H3 and mitochondrial cytochrome-c oxidase I (COI) protein-coding gene regions. In this proposed phylogeny, Strombus vittatus, Strombus canarium (= Laevistrombus canarium) and Strombus epidromis (= Labiostrombus epidromis) are closely related and appear to share a common ancestor.

References

External links
 

Strombidae
Gastropods described in 1758
Taxa named by Carl Linnaeus